The Croy Line is a suburban railway route linking Glasgow Queen Street and Croy in Scotland. It is part of the Strathclyde Partnership for Transport network.

This route is now electrified, as of December 2017. Passenger services are operated by ScotRail.

Route
Most of the route is shared with other services:
 Glasgow to Edinburgh via Falkirk Line between Glasgow Queen Street and Greenhill Junction
 Glasgow to Aberdeen Line between Glasgow Queen Street and Dunblane
 Highland Main Line between Larbert and Dunblane
 Edinburgh to Dunblane Line between Larbert and Dunblane

Historical route
The route comprises the following historical railway lines:
 Edinburgh and Glasgow Railway between Glasgow Queen Street and Greenhill Junction
 Scottish Central Railway between Greenhill Junction and Dunblane
 Stirling and Dunfermline Railway between Stirling and Alloa

References 

Transport in Glasgow
Transport in East Dunbartonshire
Transport in North Lanarkshire
Railway lines in Scotland
Standard gauge railways in Scotland